Geekfest is the name of a series of free, all-ages concerts organized by California indie label S.P.A.M Records during the 1990s. The first Geekfest was held in June 1996 on the shoreline at Point Molate in Richmond, California. This site, a former Navy fuel depot at the foot of the Richmond-San Rafael Bridge, became the default location for dozens of Geekfests, though other locations were eventually used.

Background
   
In the mid-1990s, local ordinances and economic considerations led to difficult times for San Francisco Bay Area bands whose members were under 21. Multiple bars and nightclubs were driven out by the bustling dot-com economy. Others, fearful of losing their liquor licenses, stopped allowing minors to attend or perform on their stages. By 1996, there was only one all-ages music venue in the East Bay - 924 Gilman Street.

With the rise of Green Day, Rancid, and other former underground bands making punk rock a commodity, Gilman had become an insular community, rejecting those who did not fit an increasingly narrow definition of punk. Though Gilman was not by design exclusively punk rock (they were and are explicitly devoted to independent music and arts), a combination of internal politics and aesthetic tastes of the Gilman staff kept other types of music off the stage. S.P.A.M. Records grew out of the efforts of underage musicians and artists from Pinole, California frustrated with the situation. The fringe Gilman band, The Hope Bombs, encouraged the S.P.A.M. crew, most notably by letting them jump on stage at Hope Bombs shows to play as "The Bob Weirdos" (whose shows consisted of crazed songs like "Help I'm On Fire" which actually involved setting singer John Geek on fire). But this support was the exception and the bands were generally deprived of any meaningful access to the Gilman audience.

S.P.A.M. Co-founder John Geek (now vocalist for punk band Fleshies) alluded to this in an interview:

"Along with Dan and Corbett of Bobby Joe and the Children MacNuggits (and joined soon by Robert Eggplant and Dylan McPuke), I started the S.P.A.M. Records Collective in 1995 because no one else would put out our shit or let us play."

Select work from the S.P.A.M. Records Catalog circa 1996-2002:

The S.P.A.M. bands, most notably Bobby Joe Ebola and the Children MacNuggits, had been rejected by the punk scene for what, to their minds, were superficial differences in dress and musical style. Label co-founder Corbett Redford (singer for Bobby Joe Ebola and the Children MacNuggits) said "We were all living in Pinole and we couldn't play Gilman because they said we weren't punk. We couldn't take out an ad in MRR because they said we weren't punk. ... We were thrashfunk and silly folk I suppose." They decided, in a DIY spirit, to create their own venue, one where nobody would be rejected for having the wrong fashion sense.

The name "Geekfest" was chosen partly because the S.P.A.M. collective saw themselves as geeks; they realized their idiosyncrasies made them unpopular at parties, but made no effort to change. Their rejection by the punk scene was viewed as just another chapter in a long history of being uncool; but, as John Geek says, "Our pride in maladjustment ran too damn deep."

First Geekfest 

First, S.P.A.M. founder John Geek set up a hotline, (510) BAD-SMUT, to disseminate information. In many ways, Geekfest applied the guerrilla tactics of raves to live music. Photocopied handbills listed a telephone number, but not the location of the event, to try to prevent the shows being shut down by law enforcement.

Most production, planning, stage management, cooking and facilitation was done by a core group of people from Pinole. Events were also stage managed and cooked for by the same crew. Planning for most events was eventually held at 924 Gilman as more people joined in as the show became larger.

Point Molate was selected as a location partly because it was already in use one Sunday a month for free outdoor "Sunset raves". It was far from any residential area, beneath a large bridge, and under confused jurisdiction as a Navy Superfund site. Technically, it was in Richmond, which had one of the nation's highest murder rates at the time. Local law enforcement, it seemed, was otherwise occupied.

Politically, the concept of Geekfest took an anarchist bent. It addressed issues of public land use, the role of the audience in art (since much of the time, the audience consisted of the other bands playing that day), and issues of hierarchy in a supposedly egalitarian punk scene.

Approximately 12 bands played the first show, most of who were made up of minors and bands who shared S.P.A.M.'s sense of humor and disenfranchisement. S.P.A.M. members rented a gas-powered generator, and hired a local sound engineer to work the jury-rigged P.A. In an illegal and ill-advised attempt to recoup their losses, S.P.A.M. sold cheese-filled hot dogs and cans of beer to the approximately 30 attendees. The concert lasted from about 1 p.m. until sunset (most proceeds were later spent on burritos).

Successive Geekfests 

S.P.A.M. continued putting on Geekfests, usually about one per month during the summer months and occasionally during the winter, when they could find a suitable indoor location.
The locations and the bands varied widely (though many bands had repeat performances), but the shows were always free and all-ages.

This concept of inclusion was central to the Geekfest concept, and extended to the booking policy. As word spread about the festivals, bands began calling to ask for shows, and sending promotional packages to the label's P.O. box. S.P.A.M. avoided listening to demo tapes they received, booking bands on a "first-come, first-served" basis. This was done to remove the bias of musical taste that S.P.A.M. blamed for their own exclusion from Gilman. As a result, the bands were often unskilled, untalented, or conversely, so polished and professional that they seemed wildly inappropriate at a no-frills, guerrilla concert. Geekfest organizers observed the conflicts that arose between different musical subcultures with a bemused detachment.

The length of the concerts (sometimes 8 hours or more) and the inconsistent quality of the acts made Geekfest less like a traditional concert and more like a weird carnival. Since the schedule was never listed, it was difficult for people to show up to see one band in particular. People tended to stay for most of the day and began to come as much for the playful atmosphere as for the bands.

Several Geekfest organizers, including Dan Abbott, Shawn Martin, and Dylan McPuke, were affiliated with the Amtgard live action role-playing game (who coincidentally brought amtgard to Berkeley, California), and brought homemade foam-padded swords for attendees to battle with during concerts. From then on, random foam sword battles were an integral part of Geekfest. Between bands, organizers held costume contests, raffles, and trivia games,  and videogame tournaments: usually with a nod to traditionally geeky themes like Dungeons & Dragons, "Weird Al" Yankovic, or Atari games.

Gradually, Geekfest attracted a community of disparate individuals, and become something of a scene itself. Several bands made inroads into the Gilman scene, and several Geekfests were eventually held within the Gilman club itself.

Geekfest's esoteric aesthetic also became popular among organizers within the Cannabis Action Network (CAN), which allowed S.P.A.M. Records to book second-stage performances at their annual 420 festivals, including at least one at the Maritime Hall in San Francisco on April 20, 2001(video).

Geekfest and Libertatia 

In 1997, the Geeks (as S.P.A.M./Geekfest organizers had come to be known) decided to celebrate the first anniversary of Geekfest by having a three-day campout. After a frenzied search for an appropriate site, the Geeks found Lake Ladoga, part of East Park Reservoir near Maxwell, California. It was hot, dusty, and inhospitable land under jurisdiction of the Bureau of Land Management (BLM), and the lake was a man-made body used for irrigation of nearby farms. The water was noticeably filthy, but the 107 °F heat made it a welcome respite regardless. Organizers arranged the stage so that attendees could watch the bands from the relative comfort of the lake. The attendance was estimated at around 150-200 people. Drug use was rampant, mostly psychedelics, with ubiquitous drinking during the daytime. Organizers, using kitchen equipment borrowed from Food Not Bombs, fed everyone two free meals a day: gruel in the morning, spaghetti at night.

BLM supervisor Bill Bird objected to the concert, but was overruled by the Sheriff and local merchants, who were happy for the increased business.  According to the Official Program and Event Schedule, the bands were:  The Mac Swanky Trio, Stark Raving Brad, Defile, Subincision, Harbinger, Visitor 42, The Blue Sky Smokers, Blah,Blah,Blah, Adjective Noun, Skitzo, 976, Bobby Joe Ebola and the Children MacNuggits, Lapis Lazuli, NME, Impact, Stinky Puffs, The Keeners, Ubzub, Soda Pop F*ck You, Pork and the Spork, Magic Pinecone Band, Shatousky, Banana Hammock, Hungry Hungry Hippeaux, My Sunny Disposition, The Enemies, Orka Pickles, Soundcurrent, White Trash Debutantes, Supernovice, The Frught Lupes Human Ass Orkestra, The Human Beans, Astrolloyd, Glamazon, Moxie, Erik Core, Sixence, Tone Def, Suckerfish, Wet Nap, The pilgrims, Inslight Weights and Fetish.  In the end, nearly 40 bands performed at the Geekfest Anniversary, and the Geeks immediately began planning the next year's festival.

In the intervening year, S.P.A.M. organizers had found a kindred spirit, show promoter and artist Marcus Da Anarchist, who organized "Pyrate Punx Picnics" out of San Francisco's Mission District. S.P.A.M. and the Pyrate Punx collaborated on the next campout, dubbing it "Pirates vs. Geeks". John Geek and Marcus each booked half the bands.

For the third anniversary, the Pirates and Geeks resumed an uneasy alliance, organizing a week-long Libertatia, after the anarchist pirate utopia on Madagascar founded by Captain Mission during the 18th century. It was also referred to as the "Week of Geek". As it had been before, it was free and all-ages, and organizers fed the roughly 400 attendees two meals a day. Although 100 bands were booked, only 82 showed up to perform. Still, each day of entertainment lasted from approximately noon until 10 p.m. or 11 p.m. Several Bay Area journalists also attended, and the event received coverage in local press Subsequent Libertatia festivals were noted enthusiastically by local weeklies

The demise of S.P.A.M. Records in 2003 (closely linked to the breakup of flagship band Bobby Joe Ebola and the Children MacNuggits in 2001) spelled the end of Geekfests, though the Pyrate Punx continue to organize Libertatia annually.

References

External links
John Geek writes about "Geekfest" in Maximum Rock'N'Roll 
Silke Tudor and Jack Boulware's chapter on the Pyrates and Geeks in their 2009 Bay Area punk oral history book Gimme Something Better 
Archive of 'The List' compiled by Steve Koepke detailing scheduled acts for Libertatia 2000 (June 22-25)
Bobby Joe Ebola and the Children MacNuggits discuss "Geekfest" on Music Life Radio  podcast

Music festivals in California
Anarcho-punk venues
DIY culture